Angelina Portnova (born 10 February 2001) is a Kazakhstani footballer, who plays as a goalkeeper for Adana İdmanyurduspor in the Turkish Women's Super League and the Kazakhstan women's national team.

Club career 
Portnova has played for SDYuSShOR-8 in Kazakhstan.

Mid December 2021, she moved to Turkey to join the Turkish Women's Super League club Adana İdmanyurduspor.

International career 
Portnova made her senior debut for Kazakhstan on 12 June 2021 in a 1–2 friendly away loss to Armenia.

References

External links 

2001 births
Living people
Kazakhstani people of Russian descent
Kazakhstani women's footballers
Women's association football goalkeepers
Kazakhstan women's international footballers
Kazakhstani expatriate sportspeople in Turkey
Expatriate women's footballers in Turkey
Turkish Women's Football Super League players
Adana İdmanyurduspor players